War of Illusions: German policies from 1911 to 1914 is a book by German historian Fritz Fischer, first published in German in 1969 as Krieg der Illusionen.

Along with Fischer's Germany's Aims in the First World War, the book argues for German responsibility for the outbreak of the First World War.

References

Books by Fritz Fischer
1969 non-fiction books
History books about World War I